Karl Erik Rimfeldt (born 16 February 1980) is a retired Norwegian football defender.

He started his career in Kongsvinger IL, and played for Norwegian youth national teams. He joined the senior squad in 1999, and played three Norwegian Premier League games in 1999. He played one more season before leaving. He has later played on lower levels for Sander IL and Vinger FK.

References

1980 births
Living people
Norwegian footballers
Kongsvinger IL Toppfotball players
Association football defenders